Red in Blues-ville is an album by jazz pianist Red Garland, recorded in 1959 and released the same year on Prestige Records.

Track listing 
"He's a Real Gone Guy" (Lutcher) – 5:13
"See See Rider" (Traditional) – 8:00
"M Squad (Theme)" (Basie) – 7:36
"Your Red Wagon" (DePaul, Jones, Raye) – 5:51
"Trouble in Mind" (Jones) – 5:49
"St. Louis Blues" (Handy) – 9:59

Personnel 
 Red Garland – piano
 Sam Jones – double bass
 Art Taylor – drums

References 

1959 albums
Albums produced by Esmond Edwards
Prestige Records albums
Red Garland albums
Albums recorded at Van Gelder Studio